Hucknall is a market town in the Ashfield district of Nottinghamshire, England.  The town and its surrounding area contain 15 listed buildings that are recorded in the National Heritage List for England.  Of these, one is listed at Grade II*, the middle of the three grades, and the others are at Grade II, the lowest grade.  The listed buildings include houses and cottages, a church, a former mill, a public library, a drinking fountain, a war memorial, a rest home for miners and associated structures, aircraft hangars, and a battle headquarters.


Key

Buildings

References

Citations

Sources

 

Lists of listed buildings in Nottinghamshire